Abdoul Kader Bamba (born 25 April 1994) is a French professional footballer who plays as a winger for  club Saint-Étienne, on loan from  club Nantes.

Career
A youth product of Toulouse, Bamba spent his early career in amateur leagues in France before transferring to Nantes on 27 May 2018. He made his professional debut for Nantes in a 2–1 Ligue 1 loss to Lille on 11 August 2019.

On 31 August 2021, Bamba joined Amiens on loan. On 14 January 2023, he signed for Saint-Étienne on loan until the end of the season.

Personal life
Born in France, Bamba is of Ivorian descent.

References

External links
 
 
 
 Cosmo Taverny 2013-14 Profile
 Cosmo Taverny 2014-15 Profile

1994 births
Living people
People from Sarcelles
French footballers
French sportspeople of Ivorian descent
Black French sportspeople
Association football wingers
Toulouse FC players
CS Sedan Ardennes players
Le Mans FC players
FC Nantes players
Amiens SC players
AS Saint-Étienne players
Ligue 1 players
Ligue 2 players
Championnat National 2 players
Championnat National 3 players
Footballers from Val-d'Oise